MDRA may refer to:

Democratic Movement for Algerian Renewal, a political party in Algeria
Mid Delta Regional Airport
Malta Drag Racing Association, drag racing in Malta
Minnesota Distance Running Association, in distance running
Motorcycle Drag Racing Association, in motorcycle drag racing

See also
 
 
 MDMA
 MARA (disambiguation)
 MDR (disambiguation)
 MDA (disambiguation)
 MRA (disambiguation)
 DRA (disambiguation)